The Duchy of Saxe-Jena was one of the Saxon Duchies held by the Ernestine line of the Wettin Dynasty. Established in 1672 for Bernhard, fourth son of Wilhelm, Duke of Saxe-Weimar, Saxe-Jena was reincorporated into Saxe-Weimar on the extinction of Bernhard's line in 1690.

Dukes of Saxe-Jena
 Bernhard (1672–1678)
 Johann Wilhelm (1678–1690)
Reincorporated into Saxe-Weimar

1672 establishments in the Holy Roman Empire
1690 disestablishments in the Holy Roman Empire
States and territories established in 1672
Jena